Teneal Attard (born 16 March 1985) is an Australian field hockey player from Mackay, Queensland. Attard competed in the 2008 Summer Olympics and 2012 Summer Olympics. She also plays for the Queensland Scorchers in the Australian Hockey League.

References

External links
 

1985 births
Living people
Sportspeople from Mackay, Queensland
Australian female field hockey players
Olympic field hockey players of Australia
Field hockey players at the 2008 Summer Olympics
Field hockey players at the 2012 Summer Olympics
21st-century Australian women